The women's kumite 50 kilograms competition at the 2010 Asian Games in Guangzhou, China was held on 25 November 2010 at the Guangdong Gymnasium.

Schedule
All times are China Standard Time (UTC+08:00)

Results
Legend
H — Won by hansoku

Main bracket

Repechage

References

External links
Official website

Women's kumite 55 kg